The Kho-Bwa languages, also known as Kamengic, are a small family of languages spoken in  Arunachal Pradesh, northeast India. The name Kho-Bwa was originally proposed by George van Driem (2001). It is based on the reconstructed words *kho ("water") and *bwa ("fire"). Blench (2011) suggests the name Kamengic, from the Kameng area of  Arunachal Pradesh. Alternatively, Anderson (2014) refers to Kho-Bwa as Northeast Kamengic.

Both Van Driem and Blench group the Sherdukpen (or Mey), Lishpa (or Khispi), Chug (Duhumbi) and Sartang languages together. These form a language cluster and are clearly related.
The Sulung (or Puroik) and Khowa (or Bugun) languages are included in the family by Van Driem (2001) but provisionally treated as language isolates, with no demonstrated genetic relationshipt to Kamengic, by Blench (2023).

These languages have traditionally been placed in the Tibeto-Burman group by the Linguistic Survey of India, but the justification of this is open to question.
The languages have certainly been strongly influenced by the neighboring Sino-Tibetan languages, but this does not necessarily imply genetic unity and may possibly be a purely areal effect.

The entire language family has about 15,000 speakers (including Puroik) or about 10,000 speakers (excluding Puroik), according to estimates made during the 2000s.

Word lists and sociolinguistic surveys of Kho-Bwa languages have also been conducted by Abraham, et al. (2018).

Classification
The internal structure of the Kho-Bwa group of languages is as follows.
Puroik
Bugun (Khowa)
Western Kho-Bwa
Mey–Sartang
 Sherdukpen (Mey, Ngnok), divided into two varieties:
 Shergaon
 Rupa
Sartang (Bootpa, But Monpa, But Pa, Matchopa), 50%–60% lexical similarity with Mey.
Chug–Lish
Lish (Lish)
Chug (Chug Monpa, Chugpa, Monpa), close to Lish

Lieberherr & Bodt (2017)
Lieberherr & Bodt (2017) consider Puroik to be a Kho-Bwa language, and classify the Kho-Bwa languages as follows.
Kho-Bwa
Puroik
Bugun
Western Kho-Bwa
Sherdukpen, Sartang
Chug (Duhumbi), Lish (Khispi)

Tresoldi et al. (2022)
Based on computational phylogenetic analyses from Tresoldi et al. (2022), the phylogenetic tree of Kho-Bwa is roughly as follows:

Western
Duhumbi–Khispi (Chug–Lish): Duhumbi (Chug), Khispi (Lish)
Mey–Sartang: Shergaon, Rupa, Jerigaon, Khoina, Rahung, Khoitam
Bugun
A
Bulu, Rawa, Kojo Rojo
Sario Saria, Lasumpatte, Chayangtajo
B
Namphri, Kaspi
Wangho, Dikhyang
Singchaung, Bichom

Vocabulary
The following table of Kho-Bwa basic vocabulary items is from Blench (2015).

See also
Kho-Bwa comparative vocabulary lists (Wiktionary)

Further reading

 Ismail Lieberherr and Timotheus Adrianus Bodt. (2017) Sub-grouping Kho-Bwa based on shared core vocabulary. Himalayan Linguistics 16(2). 26-63. Paper (CLDF Dataset on Zenodo )
 Binny Abraham, Kara Sako, Elina Kinny, Isapdaile Zeliang (2018). Sociolinguistic Research among Selected Groups in Western Arunachal Pradesh: Highlighting Monpa. SIL Electronic Survey Reports 2018-009. (CLDF Dataset on Zenodo. )
 Bodt, T. and J.-M. List (2019). Testing the predictive strength of the comparative method: An ongoing experiment on unattested words in Western Kho-Bwa languages. Papers in Historical Phonology 4.1. 22-44.  (CLDF Dataset on Zenodo )

References

 George van Driem (2001) Languages of the Himalayas: An Ethnolinguistic Handbook of the Greater Himalayan Region. Brill.
 Blench, Roger. 2011. (De)classifying Arunachal languages: Reconsidering the evidence
 Lieberherr, Ismael; Bodt, Timotheus Adrianus. 2017. Sub-grouping Kho-Bwa based on shared core vocabulary. In Himalayan Linguistics, 16(2).
Abraham, Binny, Kara Sako, Elina Kinny, Isapdaile Zeliang. 2018. Sociolinguistic Research among Selected Groups in Western Arunachal Pradesh: Highlighting Monpa. SIL Electronic Survey Reports 2018-009.

 
Languages of India
Proposed language families